Jeffrey Wright (born December 7, 1965) is an American actor. He is well known for his role as Belize in the Broadway production of Angels in America, for which he won a Tony Award, and its acclaimed  HBO miniseries adaptation, for which he won an Emmy and Golden Globe.

He has starred as Jean-Michel Basquiat in Basquiat, Felix Leiter in the James Bond films Casino Royale, Quantum of Solace and No Time to Die, Valentin Narcisse in the HBO series Boardwalk Empire, Beetee Latier in The Hunger Games films, Isaac Dixon in the video game The Last of Us Part II and the Watcher in the Marvel Studios animated series What If...? From 2016 to 2022, he starred as Bernard Lowe in the HBO series Westworld. He portrayed James Gordon in the superhero film The Batman (2022) by Matt Reeves.

Early life
Wright was born on December 7, 1965 in Washington, D.C., the son of Barbara Evon (Whiting), a customs lawyer, and James Charles Wright, Jr., who died when he was a child. He graduated from St. Albans School and attended Amherst College, receiving a bachelor's degree in political science, planning to attend law school, but chose instead to study acting. After attending the MFA acting program at the New York University Tisch School of the Arts for two months in 1988, he left to appear in Les Blancs at Arena Stage before transferring with it to the Huntington Theatre Company and deciding to be an actor full-time.

Career

Film, television, and theater 
Wright began appearing off-Broadway in New York City and Washington D.C. In 1990 he appeared in his first major film as an attorney in Presumed Innocent. In 1991, he joined John Houseman's national touring repertory company The Acting Company in productions of A Midsummer Night's Dream and Athol Fugard's Blood Knot. In 1993 and 1994, he appeared as Norman "Belize" Arriaga in Tony Kushner's award-winning play Angels in America. His portrayal of a gay nurse forced to take care of Roy Cohn as he dies of AIDS won him the Tony Award for Best Featured Actor in a Play.

He guest-starred in George Lucas's The Young Indiana Jones Chronicles as a fictionalized Sidney Bechet and Homicide: Life on the Street in the early to late 1990's.

In 1996, Wright portrayed painter Jean-Michel Basquiat in the film Basquiat, to critical acclaim. Throughout the 1990s and early 2000s, he appeared in leading and supporting roles in such films as Celebrity (1998), Ride with the Devil (1999), Shaft (2000), and Boycott (2001) as Martin Luther King Jr., for which he received an AFI Award. In 2003, he reprised his role as Norman "Belize" Arriaga in HBO's award-winning adaptation of Angels in America, garnering him an Emmy award and a Golden Globe award for Best Supporting Actor in a Miniseries. In 2004, he appeared in Jonathan Demme's remake of The Manchurian Candidate. In February 2005, he returned to HBO Films in Lackawanna Blues.

In 2005, he played Washington attorney Bennett Holiday in Syriana and Bill Murray's eccentric Ethiopian neighbor Winston in Broken Flowers, starred in the play This Is How It Goes, and appeared as one of the tenants in Lady in the Water. In 2006, he appeared as Felix Leiter in the James Bond film Casino Royale. He reprised the role in Quantum of Solace and No Time to Die.

In 2007, Wright starred in the alien invasion suspense thriller The Invasion. In 2008, he portrayed Colin Powell in W. He portrayed Muddy Waters in Cadillac Records, a biopic, loosely based on the rise and fall of Chess Records. In 2010, Wright played Jacques Cornet in the world premiere run of A Free Man of Color at the Vivian Beaumont Theater of the Lincoln Center for Performing Arts in New York City.

Wright plays Beetee in The Hunger Games film series, starting with The Hunger Games: Catching Fire, released in November 2013. He landed the role of Dr. Valentin Narcisse in season 4 of Boardwalk Empire, starting in the fall of 2013. Wright was nominated for three Emmys for his performance as Bernard Lowe in HBO's Westworld.

In March 2017, Wright appeared in a commercial for Dell Technologies.

In 2018, Wright produced the HBO documentary We Are Not Done Yet, which gives voice to war veterans who, through a USO-sponsored arts workshop at Walter Reed National Military Hospital, discover the power and healing of shared experience to unite and find resilience in the face of post-traumatic stress. That same year, Wright starred in HBO's O.G., a film about a man confronting his past crime and preparing to leave prison after decades behind bars. The film was directed by Madeleine Sackler, and was filmed entirely in Pendleton Correctional Facility near Indianapolis, Indiana. The film was shot in a working prison and many prisoners and staff were recruited as actors for the film, including Wright's co-star, Theotus Carter, who plays Beecher, a younger prisoner that Louis, (Wright's character) takes under his wing, which threatens Louis' release date. During shooting Wright was sometimes mistaken for a prisoner by other real prisoners and guards. The film debuted on HBO on February 25, 2019.  Nick Paumgarten of The New Yorker said, "The performances are exceptionally strong, both by the free-to-leave professional actors (especially Jeffrey Wright, who plays Louis, the 'O.G.' of the title, an older inmate on the verge of release) and by the incarcerated neophytes."  Ben Kenigsberg of The New York Times said, "Jeffrey Wright gives a rich, imposing performance as the former 'mayor' of Pendleton Correctional Facility."

Wright starred in the video game The Last of Us Part II as Isaac, the leader of the Washington Liberation Front. The game was released on June 19, 2020.

In 2021, Wright portrayed food writer Roebuck Wright in the film The French Dispatch by Wes Anderson.

Wright voices the Watcher in the Disney+ animated series What If...?, which is set in the Marvel Cinematic Universe (MCU).

Charity and business ventures 
Wright is chairman and co-founder of Taia, LLC and Taia Peace Foundation and Vice Chairman of Taia Lion Resources, Inc, a gold-exploration company looking to create a conflict-free gold mining operation in Sierra Leone.

Personal life
Wright married actress Carmen Ejogo in August 2000. They have a son named Elijah and a daughter named Juno and lived in Brooklyn, New York City. They have since divorced.

He is a fan of the Washington Commanders.

In 2004, Wright received an honorary degree from his alma mater Amherst College.

Filmography

Film

Television

Video games

Audio

Awards

References

External links

1965 births
20th-century American male actors
21st-century American male actors
African-American male actors
American male film actors
American male Shakespearean actors
American male stage actors
American male television actors
American male voice actors
Amherst College alumni
Best Supporting Actor Golden Globe (television) winners
Drama Desk Award winners
Living people
Male actors from Washington, D.C.
New York University alumni
Outstanding Performance by a Supporting Actor in a Miniseries or Movie Primetime Emmy Award winners
St. Albans School (Washington, D.C.) alumni
Tony Award winners